Myra H. Strober (born c. 1940) is professor of education, emerita, for the school of education, at Stanford Graduate School of Business, Stanford, California, US. She also sits on the editorial board of Feminist Economics, and was the president of the International Association for Feminist Economics (IAFFE) from 1997 to 1999.

Education 
Myra Strober received her degree from Cornell University School of Industrial and Labor Relations in 1962. In 1965 she gained a masters in economics from Tufts University. Her economics doctorate came from MIT in 1969.

Personal life 
Strober was married to fellow Stanford University School of Medicine professor Samuel Strober, and the two had two children. She then married psychiatrist Jay M. Jackman until his death in January 2022.

Selected bibliography

Books 
 Strober, Myra H; Gordon, Francine E (1975). Bringing women into management. New York: McGraw-Hill. .
 Strober, Myra H; Dornbusch, Sanford M (1988). Feminism, children, and the new families. New York: Guilford Press. .
 Strober, Myra H; Davisson, Abby (2023). Money and Love An Intelligent Roadmap for Life's Biggest Decisions. San Francisco, California: HarperOne. .
 Strober, Myra H; Chan, Agnes M K (1999). The road winds uphill all the way gender, work, and family in the United States and Japan. Cambridge, Massachusetts: MIT Press. .
 Strober, Myra H (2016). Sharing the Work: What My Family and Career Taught Me about Breaking Through (and Holding the Door Open for Others). Cambridge, Massachusetts: MIT Press. .
 Strober, Myra H (2011). Interdisciplinary conversations challenging habits of thought. Stanford, California: Stanford University Press. .

Journal articles and chapters in books 
 Strober, Myra H.; Jackman, Jay M (April 2003). "Fear of feedback". Harvard Business Review. 81 (4): 101–7, 124. PMID 12687924.
 Strober, Myra H.; Chan, Agnes (1998). "Husbands, wives, and housework: graduates of Stanford and Tokyo Universities". Feminist Economics. 4 (3): 97–127. .
 Strober, Myra H. (2002), "What's a wife worth?", in Yalom, Marilyn; Freedman, Estelle; Carstensen, Laura; et al. (eds.), Inside the American couple: new thinking, new challenges, Berkeley: University of California Press, pp. 174–188, 
 Strober, Myra H. (1998). "Introduction: this one's for you, Barbara". Feminist Economics. 4 (3): 1. . - Tribute edition for Barbara Bergmann.
 Strober, Myra H; Cook, Allen; Fuller, Kasi Allen (1997). "Making and correcting errors in student economic analyses: an examination of videotapes". The Journal of Economic Education. 28 (3): 255–271. .

 Strober, Myra H; Cook, Allen; Fuller, Kasi Allen (1997). "Making and correcting errors in student economic analyses: an examination of videotapes". The Journal of Economic Education. 28 (3): 255–271. .

See also 
 Feminist economics
 List of feminist economists

References

External links 
 Myra H. Strober Graduate School of Business, Stanford University
 
 "Myra H. Strober: An Oral History," Stanford Historical Society Oral History Program, 2014.
 "Pioneering Women Tier II: Women Faculty Hired at Stanford in the Late 1960s and Early 1970s," Stanford Historical Society Panel Discussion, 2016.

21st-century American economists
Cornell University School of Industrial and Labor Relations alumni
Date of birth missing (living people)
Feminist economists
1940s births
Living people
MIT School of Humanities, Arts, and Social Sciences alumni
Stanford University Graduate School of Business faculty
Tufts University School of Arts and Sciences alumni
Presidents of the International Association for Feminist Economics